The Pickle Brothers were a three-man comedy act which enjoyed considerable success during the late 1960s. Their madcap style, characterized by fast patter and constant motion, encompassed sketch comedy, spoofs of then-current television shows and commercials, and social and political humor.

The Pickle Brothers were Ron Prince, Michael Mislove, and Peter Lee. They met and first performed together while theatre arts majors at Hofstra University, on Long Island, New York. They worked alongside Francis Ford Coppola, Lainie Kazan, and Madeline Kahn. Following college, they played extensively at clubs and coffeehouses in the New York City area, including Bud Friedman's Improvisation. They were soon placed under contract by Fred Weintraub, owner of The Bitter End. They performed in concert at many colleges as well as at major clubs including The Cellar Door in Washington, D.C., and The Troubador in Los Angeles.

Beginning in 1965, they were the house act at The Bitter End in New York City's Greenwich Village, appearing on the same bill with such performers as Van Morrison, Richie Havens, and the Chapins. They were the opening act on three tours with The Beach Boys. They appeared on such major network TV shows as The Tonight Show Starring Johnny Carson and The Ed Sullivan Show. By 1967, plans were in the works for them to star in their own TV series, and a half-hour color television sitcom pilot was produced. The pilot was written by Gerald Gardner and Dee Caruso of The Monkees TV series, and directed by William Friedkin, later known for The French Connection and The Exorcist. The group disbanded in 1968, primarily over creative differences. Each former member continues to pursue creative and artistic interests.

References

American comedy troupes